Michael Smith (born 8 November 1940) is an Irish former Fianna Fáil politician who served as Minister for Defence from 1997 to 2004, Minister for Education from November 1994 to December 1994, Minister for the Environment from 1992 to 1994 and a Minister of State in various governments. He served as a Teachta Dála (TD) for the Tipperary North constituency from 1969 to 1973, 1977 to 1981 and 1987 to 2002. He also served as a Senator for the Cultural and Educational Panel from 1983 to 1987 and for the Agricultural Panel from May 1982 to December 1982.

Background and education
Smith was born in Roscrea, County Tipperary in 1940. He was educated at CBS Templemore in County Tipperary. Smith worked as a farmer before entering Dáil Éireann at the 1969 general election as a Fianna Fáil TD for the Tipperary North constituency.

He lost his seat at the 1973 general election but was re-elected to Dáil Éireann at the 1977 general election.

Political career

1980s
In 1980, the Taoiseach Charles Haughey appointed him Minister of State at the Department of Agriculture. Smith lost his Dáil seat again at the February 1982 general election, and failed to regain it at the November 1982 general election. He spent the next five years as a Senator in Seanad Éireann, elected first by the Agricultural Panel and then by the Cultural and Educational Panel, before his re-election to the Dáil at the 1987 general election.

When Smith was returned to the Dáil in 1987, he was appointed Minister of State at the Department of Energy. He was appointed to cabinet as the Minister for Energy in 1988. His stay as Minister was brief; following the 1989 general election he was demoted to Minister of State for Science and Technology.

1992–2007
In 1992, he returned to Cabinet for two years as Minister for the Environment. He replaced David Andrews as Minister for Defence in October 1997, and held that position until he was dropped from the Cabinet in a reshuffle in 2004. During his tenure Smith dealt with the Army deafness compensation issue that ultimately resulted in claims of €300 million against the State.

At the 2007 general election he lost his seat to Noel Coonan of Fine Gael.

References

1940 births
Living people
Local councillors in North Tipperary
Fianna Fáil TDs
Irish farmers
Members of the 16th Seanad
Members of the 17th Seanad
Members of the 19th Dáil
Members of the 21st Dáil
Members of the 22nd Dáil
Members of the 25th Dáil
Members of the 26th Dáil
Members of the 27th Dáil
Members of the 28th Dáil
Members of the 29th Dáil
Politicians from County Tipperary
Ministers for Defence (Ireland)
Ministers for Education (Ireland)
Ministers for the Environment (Ireland)
Ministers of State of the 28th Dáil
Ministers of State of the 26th Dáil
Ministers of State of the 25th Dáil
Ministers of State of the 21st Dáil
People from Roscrea
Fianna Fáil senators
People educated at Our Lady's Secondary School, Templemore